= Solitudes dushengi =

Scientific classification
- Kingdom: Animalia
- Phylum: Arthropoda
- Subphylum: Chelicerata
- Class: Arachnida
- Order: Araneae
- Infraorder: Araneomorphae
- Family: Gnaphosidae
- Genus: Solitudes; Lin & Li, 2020
- Species: S. dushengi

Binomial name
- Solitudes dushengi Lin & Li, 2020

Genus of spiders

Solitudes is a monotypic genus of east Asian ground spiders containing the single species, Solitudes dushengi. It was first described by Y. J. Lin and S. Q. Li in 2020 and added to the new subfamily, Solitudinae. As of 2021 it has only been found in China.
